Chingchai Mongkoltham is a Thai politician and activist currently serving as the leader of New Aspiration Party. He was Minister of Education for three months during 1997 Asian financial crisis. (15/8/1997-8/11/1997)

 
Chingchai Mongkoltham is a Thai politician and activist currently serving as the leader of New Aspiration Party.
 
He was Minister of Education for three months during 1997 Asian financial crisis (15/8/1997-8/11/1997)
 
He use the following Incidents to outed the former Education Minister Sukavich Rangsitpol.

Computer Incident

 
 Conclusion
 
 LGBT Incident Human Rights Issues
 

 

 
This has never been approved because it probably was against the minister of education speech recorded by UNESCO.
 

.According to the World Bank, Mongkoltham reverse Educational Policies leading to Thailand recentralized.
When New Aspiration Party dissolved and merged with the Thai Rak Thai party in 2001. He became the new leader of the New Aspiration Party.
 
After the election in 2001,Thaksin Shinawatra the leader of Thai Rak Thai Party, became prime minister. The New Aspiration Party has joined the government. Shortly thereafter. The New Aspiration Partywas merged with the Thai Rak Thai Party. Mostly to join Thai Rak Thai party (the governing party) with Gen. Chavalit Yongchaiyudh except Chalerm Yubamrung who return to be the Leader of the Mass Party Chingchai Mongkoltham

References

Living people
Place of birth missing (living people)
Chingchai Mongkoltham
Chingchai Mongkoltham
Chingchai Mongkoltham
1951 births
Chingchai Mongkoltham